Jana Fett was the defending champion, but lost to Lizette Cabrera in the quarterfinals.

Aryna Sabalenka won the title, defeating Cabrera in the final, 6–2, 6–4.

Seeds

Main draw

Finals

Top half

Bottom half

References 
 Main draw

Dunlop World Challenge - Singles